The Fiji Sports Council is an organisation that is the custodian of all Fiji Government owned Sporting Facilities around the country.  Fiji Sports Council is tasked to manage, maintain and upkeep all facilities under its area of responsibilities.  The Fiji Sports Council is self funding and does not receive Government Funding for its Operational Expenses.  It is also one of the leading providers of quality sports and recreational facilities and programs at national, regional and international levels. It was established in 1978 under the Fiji Sports Council Act and a year later in 1979 it hosted the first South Pacific Games.  It is not affiliated to FASANOC.  It was established under an Act of Parliament so has its own rules. The organisation is headed by its Chief Executive Officer Litiana Loabuka who is governed by a Board of Directors chaired by Businessman Peter Mazey.

Aims 
Its main aim is to foster, promote and market the recreational and sporting facilities in Fiji and to also:
 Work with other organizations involved in the business of sports and recreation
 Develop any land or other property as a source of sustainable revenue for the Council and erect and maintain buildings and other structures
 Manage and maintain any land or buildings provided for the purpose of sport and recreation
 Charge fees for admission to land or buildings under its control for maximum number of end users
 Employ and remunerate staff as required at competitive rates
 Train and employ Fiji Sports Council staff according to intellectual capital and requirements to generate wealth
 Generate $4.239 million in 2007 and an increase of 10% thereafter

Achievements 
Since its establishment in 1978, it has helped develop sporting centers and facilities and to upgrade it to international standards such as:
 Ra Sports Ground
 Lawaqa Park
 Thompson Park (Navua)

Funding 
It mainly funds its organisation by running its own advertising campaign and also collects money 
through Billboard advertising.

External links
Official Website

Sports
1978 establishments in Fiji
Sports organizations established in 1978
Government agencies of Fiji